Oliviero Fabiani (born 13 July 1990) is an Italian rugby union player. His usual position is as a Hooker, and he currently plays for Colorno in Top10.  

After the experience with Lazio, from 2014 to 2022 he played with Zebre.

In 2013 and 2014 Fabiani was named in the Italy Sevens squad to participate at the annual Sevens Grand Prix Series and in 2015, he was also named in the Emerging Italy squad for the 2015 World Rugby Tbilisi Cup.

On 18 August 2019, he was named in the final 31-man squad for the 2019 Rugby World Cup.

References

External links
ESPN Profile
All Rugby Profile
It's Rugby France Profile

1990 births
Living people
Italian rugby union players
Italy international rugby union players
Rugby union hookers
S.S. Lazio Rugby 1927 players
Zebre Parma players